Milan Hanzel (21 April 1947 – 22 November 2008) was the former Minister of Justice of Slovakia in government of Jozef Moravčík. He received his law degree from Comenius University in 1970. He died after an accident on 22 November 2008.

References

External links
 Biography 

1947 births
2008 deaths
Politicians from Košice
Justice ministers of Slovakia
Comenius University alumni